Mm..Food (stylized in all caps) is the fifth studio album by British-American rapper and producer MF Doom, released by Rhymesayers in November 2004. The album peaked at number 17 on Billboards Independent Albums chart, and number 9 on Heatseekers Albums chart. The title Mm..Food is an anagram of "MF Doom".

Background
MF Doom described Mm..Food as a concept album "about the things you find on a picnic, or at a picnic table". The album's titles and lyrics contain references to different foods, some with common metaphors and double entendres in the "street world" and the "nutritional realm".

The album is primarily produced by MF Doom, except for the tracks "Potholderz", produced by Count Bass D; "One Beer", produced by Madlib and originally intended for the joint Madlib and MF Doom album Madvillainy; and "Kon Queso" produced by PNS of Molemen. Mm..Food features guest appearances from Count Bass D, Angelika, 4ize and Mr. Fantastik.

"Kon Queso" was originally released under the name "Yee Haw" on a 12 inch single in July 2003 with Molemen. The track was re-recorded for Mm..Food with a more laidback performance from MF Doom. "Vomitspit" is a new version of the song "Vomit", with a different beat and some changed lyrics. The original release of the album included a different version of "Kookies". It was removed due to an unlicensed sample from Sesame Street, and was promptly changed to a simpler version of the song in all future physical and digital releases.

A bonus disc titled Mm..LeftOvers containing throwaway tracks and remixes from Mm..Food was released on November 16, 2004 on Hiphopsite.com. It was given away with copies of Mm..Food. The CD contained a recipe for "Villainous Mac & Cheese" by Grammy Dumile on the back of the CD insert.

The album cover art was directed by Stones Throw's art director Jeff Jank, and painted by Jason Jagel. The original painting included a blunt that was later edited out.

Critical reception

Garnering universal acclaim upon release, Mm..Food received an average score of 81 from Metacritic, based on 22 reviews. Ryan Dombal of Entertainment Weekly wrote, "Mm..Food flips countless edible metaphors over hard-hitting, jazzy beats, while never devolving into pointless parody." David Jeffries of AllMusic called it "as vital as anything he's done before and entirely untouched or stymied by the hype." Pitchforks Nick Sylvester called Mm..Food "an attempt to make good on Doom's almost fascist conceit to restore rap's golden age despite its loss of innocence." Nathan Rabin of The A.V. Club called the album "a crazy pastiche tied loopily together around obsessions with food, comic books, and supervillainy" and wrote that Doom is "exempt from the law of diminishing returns."

In 2012, Stereogum named it the best MF Doom album. In 2015, NME named it "one of the 23 maddest and most memorable concept albums." Complex named the song "Rapp Snitch Knishes" the "22nd funniest rap song of all time."

Track listing

Notes
 The 2007 vinyl edition was mastered with tracks 3 and 4 switched.
The original release of the album included a different version of "Kookies". It was removed due to an unlicensed sample from Sesame Street, and was promptly changed to a simpler version of the song in all future physical and digital releases.

Personnel
Credits are adapted from the album's liner notes.

Production
 Doom the Metal Fingered Villain – production 
 Count Bass D – production 
 Madlib – production 
 PNS of the Molemen – production 

Additional personnel
 Daniel Dumile – executive production
 Jasmine Thomas – executive production
 Alfred P. Morgan – executive production
 Brent "Abu Shiddiq" Sayers – executive production

Artwork
 Jason Jagel – artwork
 Jeff Jank – design

Charts

Notes

References

Further reading

External links
 

2004 albums
MF Doom albums
Rhymesayers Entertainment albums
Albums produced by MF Doom
Albums produced by Madlib
Concept albums